"The Walk" opens side two of the Time's second album, What Time Is It?. The song was produced, arranged, composed and performed by Prince with Morris Day later adding his lead vocals.

The funk song opens with a brief drum fill and has several throughout the song, along with drum machines.  The beat is somewhat of a march, which is emphasized by Day during the song's break by mimicking an army chant.  The "walking" bass of the song is perhaps inspired by the song's title.  The keyboards take an important role, as well as plenty of rock guitar.  Despite the song being performed nearly entirely by Prince, several band members are called out throughout the song (Jellybean Johnson and Terry Lewis) giving the song a live feel.  The ending of the song is a humorous conversation between Morris Day and Denise Matthews, lead singer of Vanity 6.  Prince himself also makes an appearance as an Italian club owner.

The U.S. 7" single was backed with the album's brief "OnedayI'mgonnabesomebody", while the Japanese 7" had "777-9311" as the B-side.  The 12" single had "'I Don't Wanna Leave You" and an edit of "The Walk" as B-sides.

"The Walk" reached #24 on the R&B charts. In addition, along with the tracks, 777-9311, and "I Don't Want to Leave You", "The Walk" peaked at #42 on the US Disco Top 80 chart.  The song became one of the Time's signature numbers.  The song is played at nearly all of their concerts.

"The Walk" was mentioned on the Ice Cream Castle track, "Chili Sauce", and was sampled on the Corporate World track "Murph Drag" and the Pandemonium track "The Latest Fashion". Prince himself mentions “The Walk” in the song “Play In The Sunshine”, a track from his “Sign O’ The Times” album.

References

The Time (band) songs
1982 singles
Songs written by Prince (musician)
Song recordings produced by Prince (musician)
1982 songs
Warner Records singles